Claudiu Varlam (born 31 May 1975 in Braşov, Romania) is a retired Romanian aerobic gymnast. He had a successful career winning five world championships medals (two gold, two silver and one bronze).   After retiring from aerobic gymnastics he became a coach of the Romanian national aerobic gymnastics team.

References

External links

1975 births
Living people
Sportspeople from Brașov
Romanian aerobic gymnasts
Male aerobic gymnasts
Romanian gymnastics coaches
Medalists at the Aerobic Gymnastics World Championships